"Lost One" is the second single from Jay-Z's comeback album Kingdom Come. It was released on November 21, 2006 and peaked at No. 58 on Billboard Hot 100. 

Its music video was released on December 4, 2006, Jay-Z's 37th birthday and notably features the rare concept car Maybach Exelero.

Music and lyrics 
The song features Chrisette Michele and is produced by Dr. Dre and Mark Batson. The song is composed by S. Carter, D. Parker, C. Payne, M. Batson, and A. Young. Dr. Dre told Scratch magazine in a 2004 interview that he had been studying piano and music theory, like in this song. The beat was used in the 2006 Rap Up by Skillz.

The first verse is rumored to be about Jaz-O, his former mentor, but is also speculated as being about former long-time friend and business partner, Damon Dash, co-founder of Roc-a-fella Records. In the song Jay-Z states, "I heard motherfuckers saying they made Hov; made Hov say, 'Okay, so, make another Hov.'" Hov refers to his previous stage name Young Hov and the lyrics parallel the history between him and Jaz-O. Jay-Z makes a reference to the film "Casino" with the line: "Shoulda stayed in food and beverage/ Too much flossing/ Too much Sam Rothstein." This reference is viewed by many as commentary on Dash.

The second verse is very arguably about Beyoncé.  The opening lyric, "I don't think it's meant to be, B," seems to be addressing the singer by her nickname.

The third verse is about his nephew, Colleek D. Luckie, who died in a car accident involving a Chrysler 300 car, which Jay-Z bought him as a graduation present. In the verse, he mentions Colleek's girlfriend was pregnant when he died. Jay-Z personally blames his nephew's death on himself.

Charts

See also
List of songs recorded by Jay-Z

References

2006 singles
Chrisette Michele songs
Jay-Z songs
Music videos directed by Anthony Mandler
Songs written by Mark Batson
Songs written by Jay-Z
Song recordings produced by Dr. Dre
Songs written by Dr. Dre
Song recordings produced by Mark Batson
2006 songs
Songs written by Chrisette Michele
Roc-A-Fella Records singles